

Incumbents 
 President: Dalia Grybauskaitė
 Prime Minister: Saulius Skvernelis
 Seimas Speaker: Viktoras Pranckietis

Events

 February: Centennial of the Restored State of Lithuania

Births

Deaths

References 

 
2010s in Lithuania
Years of the 21st century in Lithuania
Lithuania